Elisha Hunt Rhodes (March 21, 1842 – January 14, 1917) was an American soldier who served in the Union Army of the Potomac for the entire duration of the American Civil War, rising from corporal to colonel of his regiment by war's end. Rhodes' illustrative diary of his war service was quoted prominently in Ken Burns's PBS documentary The Civil War.

Early life
Rhodes was born in Pawtuxet, Rhode Island, to Elisha H. Rhodes and Eliza A. Chase. He had several sisters and two brothers. At age 14, Rhodes attended Potter and Hammond's Business Academy in Providence.

His father drowned when his schooner, the merchant ship Worcester, was sunk by a hurricane on December 10, 1858. He was buried on Linyards Cay, Abaco in the Bahamas.

Civil War

Rhodes served with the 2nd Rhode Island Volunteer Infantry throughout its service during the American Civil War.

Rhodes enlisted in the war with his mother's permission. At first he believed war to be an adventure. During the war, he advanced from corporal to lieutenant colonel in command of the regiment.

He enlisted on June 5, 1861 and was appointed to the rank of corporal.  He was promoted to sergeant major on March 1, 1862 and to 2nd lieutenant on July 24 of the same year.

On April 15, 1863 he was promoted to 1st lieutenant and placed in command of Company B.  He became the regiment's adjutant, with the rank of 1st lieutenant, on November 6, 1863.  He served in this capacity until the regiment was reorganized on June 17, 1864.

On June 21, 1864 he was promoted to captain and assigned to Company B but was also ordered to command the regiment, which he did for the remainder of the war.  He received a brevet (honorary promotion) to the rank of major on December 5, 1864.

On February 6, 1865 he was promoted to lieutenant colonel and placed in command of the regiment.  On April 2 he received a brevet to the rank of colonel in recognition of his service in the Petersburg campaign.  He was mustered out of service, along with his regiment, on July 13, 1865.

Postbellum career

After the war, he became a successful businessman and became active in veterans' affairs. He never missed a regimental reunion of the 2nd Rhode Island Volunteer Infantry.

He married Caroline Pearce Hunt (1841–1930) on June 12, 1866 and had a son, Frederick Miller Rhodes and a daughter Alice Caroline Rhodes Chace.

He was appointed as collector of U. S. Internal Revenue in Rhode Island in 1875.

From June 25, 1879 until March 21, 1892 he served as the commander of the Brigade of Rhode Island Militia with the rank of brigadier general.

During his time in office General Rhodes helped transform the militia into a more professional organization and established the state training ground at Quonset Point in North Kingstown.

Memberships

Rhodes was very active in the Grand Army of the Republic (GAR), the largest of several organizations for Union veterans.  He was Adjutant of Prescott Post, No. 1, in 1867, Commander of the post the next year, Assistant Adjutant General of the Department of Rhode Island in 1871, Commander of the department in 1872–73, member of the National Encampment in 1874–75.  He served for one year (1877–78) as the GAR's national senior vice commander.

He was also Vice President of the Society of the Army of the Potomac in 1877, and president of the Second Rhode Island Volunteer Association. He was also president of the Rhode Island Soldiers' and Sailors' Historical Society since its formation in 1873, and in 1879 was Vice President of the 6th Army Corps Association.

In 1892 he was elected as a companion of the Massachusetts Commandery of the Military Order of the Loyal Legion of the United States (MOLLUS) — a military society composed of officers who had served in the Union armed forces during the Civil War.  He was assigned MOLLUS insignia number 9476.

An active Freemason, having joined the fraternity while home on leave in 1864, he served as Worshipful Master of Harmony Lodge, No. 9, in Cranston, Rhode Island.  He was later elected Grand Master of the Grand Lodge of Rhode Island for 1892-1893.

Death and burial

Rhodes died in Providence on January 14, 1917.  He and his wife are buried at the Rhodes family plot in Swan Point Cemetery in Providence.

Legacy

Elisha Hunt Rhodes is most remembered for his wartime journal and letters published as All For the Union by a great-grandson, Robert H. Rhodes. This diary reflects Rhodes' ideas about the Civil War, including his unwavering belief that the Union must be preserved, as well as his Christian faith and belief in God. At the end it shows a somewhat conflicted young man who wanted to be home with his family after trials of war but who also found life in the Army very agreeable to him. His writings were made famous by their incorporation into filmmaker Ken Burns' PBS-TV documentary series The Civil War.

His large collection of personal relics and mementos is now owned by the Rhode Island Historical Society in Providence.

Notes/references

Bibliography

External links
GAR veterans bio of Rhodes

1842 births
1917 deaths
American diarists
People of Rhode Island in the American Civil War
Union Army generals
Burials at Swan Point Cemetery
Grand Army of the Republic officials